William James Knight (1837-1916) was an American soldier, participant in the Andrews raid and Medal of Honor recipient.

Biography 
Knight was born on January 24, 1837, in Apple Creek, Ohio. He trained as an engineer. He enlisted as a private in Company E of the 21st Ohio Volunteer Infantry on August 29, 1861. He was one of 22 soldiers who volunteered for the Andrews Raid of April, 1862. He escaped from the Confederates following his capture. He was awarded the Medal of Honor in September, 1863. He lived in Williams County for the remainder of his life. He died on September 26, 1916, and is now buried in Oakwood Cemetery, Stryker, Ohio. He is the only person from Williams County to receive a Medal of Honor.

Medal of Honor Citation 
For extraordinary heroism on April, 1862, in action during the Andrew's Raid in Georgia. Private Knight was one of the 19 of 22 men (including two civilians) who, by direction of General Mitchell (or Buell), penetrated nearly 200 miles south into enemy territory and captured a railroad train at Big Shanty, Georgia, in an attempt to destroy the bridges and track between Chattanooga and Atlanta.

References 

1837 births
1916 deaths
People from Wayne County, Ohio
Union Army officers
People of Ohio in the American Civil War

United States Army Medal of Honor recipients

American Civil War recipients of the Medal of Honor